Iceland competed at the 2020 Summer Paralympics in Tokyo, Japan, from 24 August to 5 September 2021. They did not win any medals but had several top 10 placements. Their best placement was by Már Gunnarsson who finished fifth in men's 100 m backstroke S11.

Competitors
The following is the list of number of competitors participating in the Games.

Athletics 

Men's track

Women's field

Cycling

Road

Swimming 

Two Icelandic swimmer has successfully entered the paralympic slot after breaking the MQS.

Legend: Q=Qualified; ER=European record; NR=National record

See also 
Iceland at the Paralympics
Iceland at the 2020 Summer Olympics

References 

2020
Nations at the 2020 Summer Paralympics
2021 in Icelandic sport